Finale may refer to:

Pieces of music
 Finale (music), the last movement of a piece
 Finale (album), a 1977 album by Loggins and Messina
 "Finale B", a 1996 song from the rock opera Rent
 "Finale", a song by Anthrax from State of Euphoria
 "Finale", a song by Bikini Kill from Reject All American
 "Finale", a piece of film music by John Williams from Harry Potter and the Prisoner of Azkaban
 "Finale", a song by Patrick Wolf from The Magic Position
 "Finale" (song), by Madeon
"Finale", a song by AJR from their album Neotheater
 "Finale", a track from the soundtrack of the 2015 video game Undertale by Toby Fox

Places
 Finale Emilia, a municipality in Emilia-Romagna, Italy
 Finale Ligure, a municipality in Liguria, Italy

Television
 Finale (Everybody Loves Raymond), the series finale of American sitcom Everybody Loves Raymond
 "Finale" (Modern Family), the series finale of American sitcom Modern Family
 Finale (Neighbours), the series finale of Australian soap opera Neighbours
 "Finale" (The Office), the series finale of American edition of The Office
 "Finale" (Skins series 6), the series finale of the sixth series of the British teen drama Skins
 Finale (Smallville)
 Season finale, the last episode of a single season of a television show
 Series finale, the last episode of a television show

Other uses
 Finale (novel), a 2012 novel by Becca Fitzpatrick
 Finale (film), a 2009 film
 Finale (software), music notation software

See also
 The Finale (disambiguation)
 Final (disambiguation)